Vista Grande High School is a high school in Casa Grande, Arizona started in 2009. It is part of the Casa Grande Union High School District.

It was opened to relieve continuing enrollment growth at Casa Grande Union High School, which had swelled to over 3,300 students and become Arizona's largest single-campus high school during the mid-2000s as the town it served exploded in population. The school has a capacity of 1,875 students, a capacity it is nearing as of 2012. At the start of the 2011 school year, Vista Grande had an estimated 2,000 students enrolled and is continuing to expand. Vista Grande's primary sport is football, by having the most support in means of staff, students, and accessible money. In 2010, the Spartans' varsity football team won the Arizona state independent championship over Campo Verde High School. Vista Grande is now part of Arizona's football Division 5A and can now compete for an actual state title. The Boys Varsity Soccer team went to their first playoff game in school history in 2016. Also in 2016 the Vista Grande basketball team went to the sectional tournament and lost, led by Andrew Spignor, Jeremy Zepeda, Brendan Ethinton, and the late addition of Skyler Collins among others.

References

Public high schools in Arizona
Schools in Pinal County, Arizona
Buildings and structures in Casa Grande, Arizona
2009 establishments in Arizona